The Evangelical Lutheran Church in America consists of 65 synods which are configured into nine regional offices. Each of the synods of the ELCA elects one bishop and three synod council officers at its Synod Assembly to oversee the spiritual and organizational activities of its member congregations.

Region 1 (Northwestern United States)

Region 2 (Southwestern US and Wyoming)

Region 3 (Minnesota and the Dakotas)

Region 4 (Central United States)

Region 5 (Illinois, Iowa, Wisconsin, Upper Peninsula)

Region 6 (Indiana, Kentucky, Ohio, Lower Peninsula)

Region 7 (Northeastern US)

Region 8 (Western PA, West Virginia, Maryland, Delaware)

Region 9 (Southeastern US, the Caribbean)

Notes 

 Some ELCA synods are named a specific way to avoid being confused with unrelated Lutheran denominations:
 To avoid confusion with the Lutheran Church–Missouri Synod, the synod comprising the states of Kansas and Missouri is called the "Central States Synod" as to not contain the phrase "Missouri Synod".
 To avoid confusion with the Wisconsin Evangelical Lutheran Synod, several synods in Wisconsin (the Northwest Synod of Wisconsin, East-Central Synod of Wisconsin, and South-Central Synod of Wisconsin) are named so as to not contain the phrase "Wisconsin Synod".
 Though the Slovak Zion Synod is officially part of Region 7, unlike other synods, its territory is not made up of a geographic region but rather is composed of the locations of its member congregations, some of which are not physically located within of Region 7. These congregations are in various parts of North America with members largely in the Northeast and Midwest though there is at least one member in the Canadian province of Ontario. This synod shares special relationships with both the Southern Synod of Wisconsin and the Caribbean Synod.
 Most member congregations of the Caribbean Synod are located in Puerto Rico.
 The Florida-Bahamas Synod is made up of the entire state of Florida plus member congregations in The Bahamas.
 The Pacifica Synod comprises the state of Hawaii and Southeastern California. It is unrelated to the Californian city of the same name.
 Multiple congregations in Northwestern Wyoming are members of the Montana Synod instead of the Rocky Mountain Synod.
 While most synods cover the whole or part of one state, some synods are made up of the territory of multiple states. These include:
 Northwest Intermountain Synod (Idaho, Eastern Washington)
 Montana Synod (Montana, parts of Northwest Wyoming)
 Sierra Pacific Synod (Northern and Central California, Northern Nevada)
 Pacifica Synod (Southeastern California, Hawaii)
 Grand Canyon Synod (Arizona, Southern Nevada)
 Rocky Mountain Synod (Colorado, New Mexico, Utah, Wyoming, West Texas)
 Central States Synod (Kansas, Missouri)
 Arkansas-Oklahoma Synod (Arkansas, Oklahoma)
 Northern Texas-Northern Louisiana Synod (North Texas, North Louisiana)
 Texas-Louisiana Gulf Coast Synod (Texas Gulf Coast, Southern Louisiana)
 Indiana-Kentucky Synod (Indiana, Kentucky)
 New England Synod (Connecticut, Maine, Massachusetts, New Hampshire, Rhode Island, Vermont)
 Slovak Zion Synod (various locations in North America)
 Delaware-Maryland Synod (Delaware, Central and Eastern Maryland)
 Metropolitan Washington D.C. Synod (District of Columbia and the surrounding areas in Maryland and Virginia)
 West Virginia-Western Maryland Synod (West Virginia, Western Maryland)
 Southeastern Synod (Alabama, Georgia, Mississippi, Tennessee)

See also 

 Evangelical Lutheran Church in America
 Evangelical Lutheran Church in America (Union Between Christians)

External links
ELCA: Regions and Synods

References